Paul Savage (born January 1971) is a Scottish musician and record producer, best known for being the drummer in the Scottish indie rock group The Delgados.

Early life
Savage was born in Glasgow in January 1971. As a child, he grew up in the United States before returning to Scotland in 1983.

Career

The Delgados

At school in Motherwell he met Alun Woodward and Stewart Henderson. Early bands including these three were Megan's Frame and Bubblegum. When they were forced out of Bubblegum, they formed their own band with Paul's girlfriend, Emma Pollock, and called themselves The Delgados.

Record producer and engineer
Savage has engineered, mixed and/or produced numerous records, including:
 King Creosote - From Scotland with Love (2014)
 King Creosote - That Might Well Be It, Darling (2013)
 Soup - The Beauty of Our Youth (2013)
 King Creosote – Flick the Vs (2009)
 Franz Ferdinand – “Tonight”
 Admiral Fallow - "Boots Met My Face"
 The Phantom Band – Checkmate Savage
 Brakes – "Touchdown"
 Mogwai – Ten Rapid (Collected Recordings 1996-1997)
 Mogwai – Mogwai Young Team
 Arab Strap – The Week Never Starts Round Here
 Malcolm Middleton – 5:14 Fluoxytine Seagull Alcohol John Nicotine
 Malcolm Middleton – Into The Woods
 Sluts of Trust - We Are All Sluts of Trust
 The Delgados – Domestiques
 Arab Strap – Philophobia
 Aereogramme – A Story in White
 Malcolm Middleton – Into the Woods
 Arab Strap – The Last Romance
 Mother and the Addicts - Take the Lovers Home Tonight'
 Various Artists (Vashti Bunyan, King Creosote, Mike Heron, Malcolm Middleton, Aidan Moffatt, Emma Pollock, Trashcan Sinatras, Aereogramme, James Yorkston) – Ballads of the Book Teenage Fanclub – 2 B sides for "Man Made"
 King Creosote – Bombshell The Twilight Sad – Fourteen Autumns and Fifteen Winters Emma Pollock – Watch the Fireworks Mother and the Addicts – Science Fiction Illustrated Camera Obscura – 6 B-sides for Let's Get Out of This Country Franz Ferdinand – All My Friends (cover of LCD Soundsystem)
 Malcolm Middleton – Sleight of Heart Zoey Van Goey – The Cage was Unlocked All Along Wake the President - You Can't Change that Boy Lord Cut-Glass – Lord Cut-Glass Mogwai - Hardcore Will Never Die But You Will Emma Pollock – The Law of Large Numbers Zoey Van Goey – Propellor Versus Wings Deacon Blue -  The Hipsters RM Hubbert - Thirteen Lost & Found Adam Stafford - Build a Harbour Immediately''

References

1971 births
Living people
Scottish drummers
British male drummers
British record producers
English record producers
21st-century drummers
21st-century British male musicians